Banteidor Lyngdoh is a People's Democratic Front politician from Meghalaya. He has been elected in Meghalaya Legislative Assembly election in 2018 from Mawkynrew constituency as candidate of People's Democratic Front. He was Minister of Horticulture, Agriculture, Sericulture & Weaving, Sports & Youth Affairs in Conrad Sangma ministry from 2018.

References 

Living people
People's Democratic Front (Meghalaya) politicians
Meghalaya MLAs 2018–2023
Year of birth missing (living people)
People from Shillong